Luopioinen is a former municipality of Finland, situated about  from Tampere. It is part of the Pirkanmaa region and in 2007 it was joined to the municipality of Pälkäne. It is a rural town containing a few lakes, most famous being lake Kukkia.

History 
Luopioinen was established during the Middle Ages, though the exact date is unclear. It remained a small village until 1693 when it acquired a chapel. At this time, Luopioinen was a part of the Hauho parish and was also known as Vesikansa. It became an independent parish in 1880, by then the alternative name Vesikansa had fallen out of use.

Aitoo was first mentioned in 1890.

Luopioinen was consolidated with Pälkäne in 2007.

Name 
The name of Luopioinen comes from either a dialectal noun luopa meaning a narrow strait or from the verb luoda. It is unrelated to the word luopio meaning "apostate".

Statistics
 Established in 1868
 Population 2,372 (as of December 31, 2003)
 Age distribution
 0–14 yrs 14.9%
 15–64 yrs 57.1%
 65– yrs 28.0%
 Total area 391.8 km², of which 74.3 km² are lakes
 Income tax percentage 18.50%
 Unemployment rate 9.3% (as of 2002)

People born in Luopioinen
August Hyöki (1874–1960)

External links
 Pälkäne municipality

References

Populated places disestablished in 2007
Former municipalities of Finland